Krajna Brda is a small settlement in the hills north of Blanca in the Municipality of Sevnica in eastern Slovenia. The area is part of the historical region of Styria. The municipality is now included in the Lower Sava Statistical Region.

References

External links
Krajna Brda at Geopedia

Populated places in the Municipality of Sevnica